Warren House may refer to:

United Kingdom
Warren House Inn, Dartmoor, Devon, England
Warren House Colliery, Rawmarsh, South Yorkshire, England

United States
Russell Warren House, San Francisco, California, listed on the National Register of Historic Places (NRHP) in California
White-Warren Tenant House, Sandtown, Delaware, NRHP-listed
Edward Kirk Warren House and Garage, Evanston, Illinois, NRHP-listed
Warren House Hotel or Old Stone Hotel, Warren, Illinois, NRHP-listed
Williams-Warren-Zimmerman House, Terre Haute, Indiana, NRHP-listed
Warren Opera House Block and Hetherington Block, Greenfield, Iowa, NRHP-listed
McMullin-Warren House, Sebree, Kentucky, listed on the NRHP in Kentucky
Robert Penn Warren House, Prairieville, Louisiana, NRHP-listed
 Warren House (Franklinton, Louisiana), listed on the NRHP in Louisiana
David Warren House, Hartford, Maine, NRHP-listed
Warren, Frederick Fiske and Gretchen Osgood, House, Harvard, Massachusetts, listed on the NRHP in Massachusetts
Beck-Warren House, Cambridge, Massachusetts, NRHP-listed
Langford H. Warren House, Cambridge, Massachusetts, NRHP-listed
Dr. Samuel Warren House, Newton, Massachusetts, NRHP-listed
Clifford-Warren House, Plymouth, Massachusetts, NRHP-listed
H. Warren House, Somerville, Massachusetts, NRHP-listed
Nathan Warren House, Waltham, Massachusetts, NRHP-listed
Jonah Warren House, Westborough, Massachusetts, NRHP-listed
Warren, William, Two Rivers House Site and McDougall, Peter, Farmstead, Royalton, Minnesota, listed on the NRHP in Minnesota
Warren-Erwin House, Washington, Mississippi, listed on the NRHP in Mississippi
Warren-Guild-Simmons House, Jackson, Mississippi, listed on the NRHP in Mississippi
Warren's Opera House, Friend, Nebraska listed on the NRHP in Nebraska
Warren House and Warren's Store, Prospect Hill, North Carolina, listed on the NRHP
Moses Warren House, Shaker Heights, Ohio, listed on the NRHP in Ohio
Frank M. Warren House, Portland, Oregon, listed on the NRHP in Oregon
Daniel Knight Warren House, Warrenton, Oregon, NRHP-listed
Marcus Warren House, Louisville, Tennessee, listed on the NRHP
Warren-Crowell House, Terrell, Texas, listed on the NRHP
Gordon-Baughan-Warren House, Richmond, Virginia, NRHP-listed
 Warren House (Surry, Virginia), listed on the NRHP
Stephen Warren House, Hartland, Wisconsin, listed on the NRHP
Nagle-Warren Mansion, Cheyenne, Wyoming, NRHP-listed